"False Positive" is the 12th episode of the sixth season of the CBS sitcom How I Met Your Mother, and the 124th episode overall. It aired on December 13, 2010. It features guest star Alex Trebek.

Plot

Ted is outside a movie theater showing It's a Wonderful Life, waiting for the rest of the gang and carrying a gingerbread house as their Christmas-themed movie snack. Future Ted backtracks to two days before, when Marshall and Lily eagerly await the results of her latest pregnancy test. The test is positive and they excitedly tell Ted, Barney, and Robin the news, but the doctor later says it is a false alarm and Future Ted tells the story of what happened during the past two days.

Prior to the test, Ted and Punchy begin talking about Punchy's wedding. After hanging up, Ted argues with Robin about his ability to be an effective best man, especially in the event that Punchy gets cold feet. Robin reveals that she auditioned as a "currency rotation specialist" (coin-flip bimbo) in the game show Million Dollar Heads or Tails, hosted by Alex Trebek. Ted rebukes her for bailing on her New Year's Resolution to be working for the World Wide News network by the end of the year. Robin admits that she applied for the network, but only an associate researcher position is available. 

When Marshall and Lily break the news of the pregnancy, Robin becomes aware of how her own life is stalling, and resolves to take the research position, but when they reveal the false positive, she changes her mind once more, deciding that she is content to be a "coin-flip bimbo".

Barney, meanwhile, has received an end-of-year bonus, which he intends to spend on luxuries for himself, including a suit with diamond pinstripes. When he hears about the pregnancy, he realizes how unfulfilled his selfishness has left him, and decides to spend the money helping others. After buying the patrons of MacLaren's designer clothes, toys and condoms, and taking them to a strip club, Barney goes to see Sam Gibbs, his brother's father and a minister, to make a donation to his church. He begins to write a check for $10,000 when he gets the news about the false positive, and adds a decimal point to turn it into $100, returning to his selfish ways and, indeed, buying his diamond-striped suit.

Immediately after they discover and announce the pregnancy test's results, Marshall and Lily secretly begin to panic about how unprepared they are to raise a child, and scramble to complete pre-delivery remodelling of their apartment in one night. After an argument about playing music for the child, the couple see the doctor, who tells them Lily is not pregnant.

Marshall and Lily meet up with the rest of the gang outside the theater and admit that they are relieved about the false positive. Since they are not ready for kids, they are considering getting a dog for now. When Robin and Barney agree with them, Ted angrily smashes the gingerbread house and orders everybody to reconsider their decisions, forcing Marshall and Lily to go straight back home to try to conceive, yelling to the "criminals of New York" about Barney's suit, effectively making him a walking target for theft, and ordering Robin to take the research job. When Punchy calls him, suffering the predicted cold feet, Ted angrily orders him to get married, solving that problem as well. After everyone leaves, he decides to watch It's a Wonderful Life alone.

In the end, Marshall and Lily continue trying to conceive, Barney returns the diamond suit, makes his intended cash donation to the ministry and also donates suits for jobless people to wear to interviews, and Robin begins her first day at World Wide News. Back at the apartment, Robin thanks Ted for his fit of rage and he accepts her offer to be the best man if she ever marries anyone else.

Critical response 

Donna Bowman of The A.V. Club gave the episode an A− rating.

Robert Canning of IGN gave the episode a rating of 9.5 out of 10.

DeAnn Welker of Television Without Pity graded the episode an A.

References

External links 
 

2010 American television episodes
American Christmas television episodes
How I Met Your Mother (season 6) episodes
Pregnancy-themed television episodes